The 1977 Maryland Terrapins football team represented the University of Maryland in the 1977 NCAA Division I football season. In their sixth season under head coach Jerry Claiborne, the Terrapins compiled an 8–4 record (4–2 in conference), finished in a tie for third place in the Atlantic Coast Conference, and outscored their opponents 254 to 179. The team ended its season with a 17–7 victory over Minnesota in the Hall of Fame Classic. The team's statistical leaders included Larry Dick with 1,351 passing yards, George Scott with 894 rushing yards, and Vince Kinney with 505 receiving yards.

Schedule

Roster

References

Maryland
Maryland Terrapins football seasons
All-American Bowl champion seasons
Maryland Terrapins football